The Bristol Robotics Laboratory (BRL), established in 2004, is the largest academic centre for multi-disciplinary robotics research in the UK. It is the result of a collaboration between the University of Bristol and the University of the West of England in Bristol and is situated on UWE's Frenchay Campus. An internationally recognised Centre of Excellence in Robotics, the Bristol Robotics Laboratory covers an area of over 4,600 sq. metres (50,000 sq. feet). The Laboratory is currently involved in interdisciplinary research projects addressing key areas of robot capabilities and applications including human-robot interaction, unmanned aerial vehicles, driverless cars, swarming behaviour, non-linear control, machine vision and soft robotics. The BRL director is Professor Chris Melhuish, serving with deputies Tony Pipe and Arthur Richards.

History 
The BRL was formed in 2006.

In 2014, BBC News at Six was broadcast live from the BRL. The feature was the third of a three part series of pre-budget specials fronted by anchor George Alagiah and then Chief Economics Correspondent Hugh Pym.

References

External links

Robotics organizations
Robotics in the United Kingdom
Laboratories in the United Kingdom
Science and technology in Bristol
2004 establishments in England